Chuck Rock II: Son of Chuck is a slapstick side-scrolling platform video game developed by Core Design and published by Virgin Interactive Entertainment in 1993 for the Amiga, CD32, Game Gear, Sega CD, Master System, and Mega Drive/Genesis.

The story takes up a little while after the end of the first game. After Chuck Rock rescued his wife, Ophelia Rock, from the T-Rex bully Gary Gritter, Chuck and Ophelia had a son, named Chuck Junior. Chuck senior works in a factory, where he develops great skill at carving automobiles out of stone. A rival manufacturer, named Brick Jagger (a pun on Rolling Stones lead vocalist Mick Jagger) becomes jealous of Chuck's abilities and kidnaps him, leaving it up to Junior to rescue his father.

Gameplay
The gameplay is similar to the first game, but with some minor differences since the player controls Junior, rather than Chuck. This is a side-scrolling platform game with occasional rock-moving puzzles thrown in. Unlike Chuck, Junior carries a club that gives his attacks further reach.

Soundtrack
Chuck Rock II uses an acid jazz soundtrack.  The end credits thank various contemporary acid jazz bands, presumably listing them as influences. The in-game boss "Ozrics Tentacles" shares a name with psychedelic rock band Ozric Tentacles.

Reception 

Electronic Gaming Monthly praised the Game Gear retaining all the features and technical merits of the Genesis version, making particular note of the huge levels, "lots of technique", and good animations, though they criticized that the control is too loose. They score it a 7 out of 10. They gave the Sega CD version a 6.8 out of 10, commenting that this time the control is too stiff, but praising the opening cinema and the numerous bits of humor implemented in the level designs.

Legacy
Around the time of the game's release, Core commissioned a comic strip in the long-running UK children's magazine Look-in, centering on the day-to-day lives of Chuck, Ophelia and Junior. As a meta-referential joke, Chuck Jr owned a 'SteggaDrive' console, as a reference to the Genesis' original Mega Drive name. A year later the magazine was closed (after almost 25 years), and the final strip saw Chuck being swept away from his boat, presumed dead but washing up on a tribal island and being revered as a God - as a comic touch, mourners at his 'funeral' included then-Prime-Minister John Major.

References

External links

Chuck Rock II: Son of Chuck at GameFAQs
Chuck Rock II: Son of Chuck at Hall of Light

1993 video games
Amiga games
Amiga CD32 games
Core Design games
Master System games
Prehistoric people in popular culture
Sega CD games
Game Gear games
Sega Genesis games
Video games about children
Video games scored by Nathan McCree
Video games set in prehistory
Virgin Interactive games
Video games developed in the United Kingdom
Single-player video games